Böttger, Boettger, or Bottger is a German surname. Notable people with the surname include:

 Adolf Böttger (1815–1870), German translator and poet
 Caesar Rudolf Boettger (1888–1976), German malacologist
 Fritz Böttger (1902–1981), German actor and director
 Ike Boettger (born 1994), American football player
 Johann Friedrich Böttger (1682–1719), German alchemist
 Nancy Boettger (born 1943), Iowa Republican State Senator
 Matthias Böttger (born 1974), German architect and curator
 Oskar Boettger (1844–1910), German zoologist
 Rudolf Christian Böttger (1806–1881), German chemist
 Thomas Böttger (born 1957), German composer and pianist

See also 
 5194 Böttger, an asteroid

German-language surnames
Occupational surnames